Founded by Bruce Basso, Fred de Grosz and Doug Alburger, ABD Insurance & Financial, Inc. was a large Northern California-based insurance and financial services broker. ABD was headquartered in Redwood City, California.

ABD Inc. accounted for $165 million in 2005 U.S. revenue, ranking as the nation's 14th largest insurance brokerage, according to Business Insurance magazine's July 2006 rankings. It ranked 2nd on the San Francisco Business Times' 2006 List of the Largest Insurance Brokers in the Bay Area, with just over $1 billion in Bay Area-generated 2005 premium volume, and $2.26 billion in overall premium volume that year. At the time, it had 575 brokers and about 800 employees companywide. It became part of Wells Fargo Insurance Services with the Wells Fargo acquisition of GBBK in 2007.

History
Formed in 1990 through the merger of the Mario L. Basso Agency and Alburger de Grosz, Inc., ABD Insurance & Financial then grew to become the 14th largest brokerage in the United States.

In 2002, Greater Bay Bancorp (GBBK) acquired ABD Insurance & Financial for $200 million. 

In early 2007, Wells Fargo Bank agreed with Greater Bay Bancorp (GBBK) on a $1.5 billion acquisition that would also integrate ABD into its own subsidiary Wells Fargo Insurance Services. The parent companies' merger became effective on 1 October 2007.

References

External links
 

Companies based in Redwood City, California
Financial services companies established in 1990
1990 establishments in California